The Roland System 700 was a professional monophonic modular synthesizer for electronic music manufactured by the Roland Corporation and released in 1976 and was followed by the Roland System-100M in 1978.

Modules 

The System 700 range included the following modules:

 701A – Keyboard controller
 702A – VCO-1
 702B – VCO-2
 702C – VCO-3
 703A – VCF-1
 703B – VCF-2
 703G – VCF (Block 8)
 704A – VCA-1
 704B – VCA-2
 704D – VCA (Block 8)
 705A – Dual envelope generator
 706A – LFO-1
 706B – LFO-2
 707A – Amplifier / envelope follower / integrator
 708A – Noise / ring generator
 709A – Sample and hold
 710A – Multiple jacks
 711A – Reverberator / panning / standard oscillator / phase shifter
 712A – Monitor / external keyboard controller / voltage processor / keyboard CV output / gate output
713A - Gate delay
 714A – Interface
 715A – Multi-mode filter/Audio mixer
 716A – Mixer (Signal/CV)
 717A – Analog sequencer
 718A – Power Supply
 720B – 2 Channel Phase Shifter
 721A – 2 Channel Audio Delay
 723A – Analog Switch

Blocks 

The following blocks were offered, as suggested combinations of modules:

 Block 1: The main console – 702A, 702B, 702C, 708A, 703A, 703B, 704A, 704B, 711A; 712A, 705A, 706B, 709A, 707A, 705A, 716A, 710A, 718A
 Block 2: Keyboard controller – 701A
 Block 3: Analog sequencer – 717A
 Block 4: VCO bank – 3x 702D, 3x 702E; 716A, 710A, 706B, 709B, 705A
 Block 5: VCF / VCA bank – 2x 703C, 3x 704C; 713A, 2x 705A, 710A
 Block 6: Interface / mixer – 714A, 704C, 715A
 Block 7: Phase shifter / audio delay – 710B, 723A, 720B, 721A
 Block 8: 'Lab' configuration – 702A, 702B, 702C, 708A, 703G, 704D, 716A, 706A, 709A, 705A, 718A

Documentation 

 101 – Synthesizer instruction manual
 101 – Synthesizer patch book
 102 – Expander unit instruction manual
 102 – Expander unit patch book
 103 – Audio mixer instruction manual
 104 – Sequencer instruction manual
 System 700 Synthesizer Service Notes
 System 700 Synthesizer Service Supplement

Notable users 
The System 700 was used by many artists, including:
Rhett Lawrence
Isao Tomita
Matthias Becker
Eric Carmen
Vince Clarke
Paul Davis, singer/songwriter and owner of Monarch Sound Atlanta GA
Eloy Fritsch
Depeche Mode
Klaus Netzle
The Human League
Visage
Hans Zimmer
Giorgio Moroder
Richard Barbieri of Japan

References 

System 700
Monophonic synthesizers
Analog synthesizers
Modular synthesizers
Musical instruments invented in the 1970s